Norman Lim Kwong  (born Kwong Lim Yew; ; October 24, 1929 – September 3, 2016) was a Canadian football player who played for the Calgary Stampeders and Edmonton Eskimos of the Canadian Football League (CFL). He was also an active businessman and politician being part owner of the Calgary Flames and serving as the 16th Lieutenant Governor of Alberta from January 2005 to May 2010.

The son of Chinese immigrants from Taishan, Guangdong, Kwong was the first Canadian professional gridiron football player of Chinese heritage. In addition, Kwong was also the first person of Chinese heritage to serve as lieutenant-governor of Alberta.  As a former vice-regal representative of Alberta, he was styled "The Honourable" for life. Kwong was the third Canadian of Chinese heritage to be appointed as a vice-regal in Canada, after David Lam and Adrienne Clarkson.

Early life 
Kwong was born in Calgary, Alberta on October 24, 1929, to a Chinese immigrant family. His father, Charles Lim Kwong, immigrated to Canada in 1907 and had to pay the head tax, and his mother, Lily Lee, immigrated with her family in 1912. Their marriage was arranged by their parents. They lived in British Columbia at first, but moved to Calgary because anti-Chinese discrimination was less severe there, and Charles was able to open his own business, the Riverside Cash and Carry Store. Norman (Lim Kwong Yew) was the fifth of six siblings. They were lucky to have both parents in Canada, as family reunion was restricted at the time for Chinese Canadians and many children grew up with one parent.

Sports career

In 1947, Canada's Chinese Exclusion Act was repealed for contravening the United Nations' Universal Declaration of Human Rights. Chinese Canadians were given citizen rights for the first time, and barriers for Chinese in professional sports also came down.

After playing football at Western Canada High School, Kwong went on to play for the Calgary Stampeders from 1948 to 1950 and, after a trade, the Edmonton Eskimos from 1951 until his retirement in 1960. Nicknamed the "China Clipper", Kwong was the first Chinese Canadian to play on a professional Canadian football team. A powerful fullback, in 11 years of recorded statistics Kwong rushed for 9,022 yards for an average of 5.2 yards per carry and scored 93 touchdowns. He won the Grey Cup four times during his career (1948, 1954, 1955, and 1956). Kwong was a Western Conference all-star running back and three-time winner of the Eddie James Memorial Trophy, in 1951, 1955 and 1956. He was named the Schenley Most Outstanding Canadian in 1955 and 1956. He was named Canadian Athlete of the Year in 1955. He was inducted into the Canadian Football Hall of Fame in 1969, Canada's Sports Hall of Fame in 1975, the Edmonton Eskimos' Wall of Honour in 1983, the Alberta Sports Hall of Fame in 1980, and the Calgary Stampeders' Wall of Fame in 2012 (as a builder of that sports organization). In November 2006, he was one of very few of his contemporaries to be voted one of the Canadian Football League's Top 50 players of the sport's modern era by Canadian sports network TSN. Kwong set the CFL record for the most yards rushing by a Canadian in a season with 1,437 in the 1956 season. This record held for 56 years, being broken by Jon Cornish only in 2012, though Kwong accomplished his record in fifteen games, rather than eighteen for Cornish.

He was president and general manager of the Calgary Stampeders from 1988 to 1991, leading the team to a loss in the Grey Cup final in 1991. Between 1980 and 1994, Kwong was a part owner of the Calgary Flames, having been one of the original group of six Calgary businessmen who bought and moved the NHL's Atlanta Flames hockey team to Calgary in 1980. The Calgary Flames won the Stanley Cup in 1989, making him one of five people whose name is on both the Grey Cup and the Stanley Cup. The feat would later be matched by Wayne Gretzky, who in an interesting symmetry to Kwong's achievement has his name on the Stanley Cup four times as a player and on the Grey Cup once as an owner.

Public service career
Kwong's public stature from sports helped him move on to politics and government. In 1971 he ran for the Alberta Progressive Conservative party in Calgary-Millican. In this election, the PCs ended Social Credit's 36-year hold on power, winning all but five seats in Calgary. However, Kwong himself was defeated by longtime incumbent Arthur J. Dixon who won by a 1,600 vote plurality.

In 1988 Kwong was made a member of the Order of Canada and served as the national chairman of the Canadian Consultative Council on Multiculturalism. Kwong was appointed Lieutenant-Governor of Alberta on January 20, 2005, replacing Lois Hole, who died in office on January 6, 2005.  Kwong welcomed Queen Elizabeth II to Alberta in June 2005 on a visit commemorating Alberta's first 100 years in Canadian Confederation. During a private audience the Queen presented Kwong with the insignia of a Knight of Justice in the Most Venerable Order of the Hospital of St John of Jerusalem.

Kwong swore Ed Stelmach into office as the 13th Premier of Alberta on December 14, 2006. Kwong's term concluded on May 11, 2010, and he was succeeded by Don Ethell.

Personal life
Kwong married Mary Lee on March 26, 1960, and together they had four sons: Gregory, Bradley, Martin, and Randall. He died in his sleep on September 3, 2016, at the age of 86. He was survived by his wife, four sons, and ten grandchildren.

Arms

Honours

 In 2006 Kwong received an Honorary Degree of Doctor of Laws from the University of Alberta.

See also
 The Honourable David Lam - former Lieutenant Governor of British Columbia and Canada's first vice-regal of Chinese heritage
 The Right Honourable Adrienne Clarkson - former Governor General of Canada and the first Chinese Canadian to serve in the post
 Larry Kwong, the original "China Clipper", former NHL hockey player and first Chinese-Canadian NHL player
 Peter Ing former NHL goaltender
 Philip S. Lee, former Lieutenant Governor of Manitoba

See also
Lost Years: A People's Struggle for Justice

References

External links

 Lost Years (Episode 2) CBC TV, August 27, 2011 & March 3, 2012
 CBC News - Jan 19 2005: Ex-footballer Normie Kwong Alberta's new lieutenant-governor
 Office of the Lieutenant Governor
 "Calgary Flames" , Canadian Encyclopedia.
 CCNC - Chinese Canadians - Normie Kwong
 Government of Alberta News Release - Jan 19 2005: Premier Klein praises choice of new Lieutenant Governor
 Historica Minute: Normie Kwong
 "Norman Kwong". The Canadian Encyclopedia.
 Canada's Sports Hall of Fame profile

1929 births
2016 deaths
21st-century Canadian politicians
Calgary Flames owners
Calgary Stampeders players
Canadian sportsperson-politicians
Canadian football fullbacks
Canadian Football Hall of Fame inductees
Canadian Football League Most Outstanding Canadian Award winners
Canadian football running backs
Canadian politicians of Chinese descent
Canadian sportspeople of Chinese descent
Edmonton Elks players
Knights of Justice of the Order of St John
Lieutenant Governors of Alberta
Members of the Alberta Order of Excellence
Members of the Order of Canada
People educated at Western Canada High School
Canadian football people from Calgary
Politicians from Calgary
Progressive Conservative Association of Alberta candidates in Alberta provincial elections
Stanley Cup champions